The NME Album of the Year and Single Of The Year was announced on 20 November 2012. It was the 39th countdown of the most popular albums and tracks of the year, as chosen by music reviewers and independent journalists who work for the magazine and for NME.com.

Albums

Bold: indicates Album contains track that won Single of the Year.

Countries represented
 = 23
 = 19
 = 5
 = 2
 = 1
 = 1

Singles

Artists with multiple entries

3 Entries
Peace (13, 43, 47)

2 Entries
Grimes (6, 16)
Tame Impala (9, 40)
Frank Ocean (12, 46)
Kanye West (15, 39)
Big Sean (15, 39)
The Cribs (17, 26)

Countries represented

 - 27
 - 15
 - 5
 - 3
 - 1
 - 1

References

New Musical Express
British music-related lists
2012 in British music